Mutual Appreciation is a 2005 independent film by Andrew Bujalski who previously directed Funny Ha Ha (2002). The script is primarily dialogue between a group of young people as they try to determine where they fit in the world. It is considered part of the mumblecore movement.

Plot
The principal characters are Lawrence, Ellie, Alan and Sara. Lawrence, a teaching assistant, and Ellie have been together for about a year. Lawrence loves Ellie, and she outwardly reciprocates while masking her doubts about their relationship. Sara is a radio disc jockey. She meets Alan, a former member of a band called The Bumblebees, at the radio station and invites him to her apartment.

Cast
 Justin Rice — Alan
 Rachel Clift — Ellie
 Andrew Bujalski — Lawrence
 Seung-Min Lee — Sara
 Kevin Micka — Dennis
 Bill Morrison — Walter
 Pamela Corkey — Patricia
 Mary Varn — Rebecca
 Kate Dollenmayer — Hildy
 Keith Gessen — Julian

Production
Shot in black-and-white, the film stars Justin Rice of the indie rock band Bishop Allen and features music from the band's debut album Charm School. Andrew Bujalski's previous film Funny Ha Ha starred Christian Rudder, also of Bishop Allen.

Reception
On review aggregator website Rotten Tomatoes, the film holds an approval rating of 87% based on 54 reviews, and an average rating of 7.7/10. The website's critical consensus reads, "Director Bujalski continues to give cinematic voice to awkward, literate twentysomethings with noteworthy smarts and tenderness." On Metacritic, the film has a weighted average score of 84 out of 100, based on 21 critics, indicating "universal acclaim".

References

External links
 Mutual Appreciation Site
 UK Site
 Manohla Dargis' review in The New York Times
 

2005 films
American romantic comedy-drama films
2005 romantic comedy-drama films
American independent films
American black-and-white films
Films set in Brooklyn
2005 independent films
Mumblecore films
2005 comedy films
2005 drama films
2000s English-language films
2000s American films